Frank Temile (born 15 July 1990) is a Nigerian footballer who plays as a striker.

Playing career

Covenant Lagos
Born in Lagos, Nigeria, Frank Temile began his football career in his native country Nigeria where he began with Covenant Lagos.

Shooting Stars
Temile joined leading Nigerian Premier League side Shooting Stars where he played the 2006–07 season with the club.

Valletta
Following some impressive displays for Shooting Stars, Frank gained a move to Valletta, where he was allocated the number 14 shirt. He was chosen as the third foreigner to play for Valletta. On 4 October 2007, he made his debut in the 2–1 defeat against Sliema Wanderers.

In his first season (2007–08) he scored 10 goals, and helped the club win the Maltese Premier League for the first time in seven years. His impact during the first season was so great that he was nominated for three prestigious awards in the Malta Football Awards. These are Best Forward, Most Promising Player and Best Foreign Player. Morevover he managed to win all the three awards he was nominated in. He also won Replay Gala Night Player of the Year, where the local players voted for him.

On 26 May 2008, it was reported that Temile, together with his agent Henry Ekezie, had travelled to Munich for a trial with a leading German club.

Dynamo Kyiv
Temile joined FC Dynamo Kyiv in the summer of 2008. In his five-years with the club he only made one league cap and three caps in the Ukrainian Cup. In his tenure with Dynamo, Temile was mostly used in the reserve team FC Dynamo-2 Kyiv that played in the Ukrainian First League.

Back to Malta
Temile joined Birkirkara in the 2013 summer transfer market. The next season Temile joined Qormi. On February 2, 2015 he moved to Naxxar Lions.

Personal life
Temile was an orphan. Unfortunately he lost his mother when he was three and his father when he was 11. He moved to Malta when he was 16 years old where he was adopted by the family Gauci.

Temile comes from a football family. His uncle, Clement Temile, who is the father of Israeli international Toto Tamuz, was capped by Nigeria several times and his brother, Omonigho Temile, played for Botev Plovdiv.

Honours

Club
 Maltese Premier League
 Winner : 2007–08 with Valletta
 Maltese Super Cup 
 Winner : 2013–14 with Birkirkara

Individual
 Malta Football Awards
 Best Forward
 Winner : 2007–08
 Most Promising Player
 Winner : 2007–08
 Best Foreign Player
 Winner : 2007–08

References

External links
 Frank Temile at MFA
 

1990 births
Living people
Nigerian footballers
Nigerian expatriate footballers
Shooting Stars S.C. players
Birkirkara F.C. players
Valletta F.C. players
FC Dynamo Kyiv players
FC Oleksandriya players
Sliema Wanderers F.C. players
Qormi F.C. players
Naxxar Lions F.C. players
Lija Athletic F.C. players
Ukrainian Premier League players
Maltese Premier League players
Association football forwards
Frank
Expatriate footballers in Ukraine
Expatriate footballers in Malta
Nigerian expatriate sportspeople in Ukraine
Nigerian expatriate sportspeople in Malta
Maltese Challenge League players